Mohawk High School is a public high school in Sycamore, Ohio, United States. It is part of the Mohawk Local School District.

Ohio High School Athletic Association Team State Championships 
 Girls Softball – 2003, 2005

References

External links 
 

High schools in Wyandot County, Ohio
Public middle schools in Ohio
Public high schools in Ohio